Sussex Inlet is a town in the South Coast region of New South Wales, Australia. The town lies on the west bank of the waterway called Sussex Inlet, which divides New South Wales from the Jervis Bay Territory. The town lies within the City of Shoalhaven. 

Geography

The town of Sussex Inlet is located on the west bank of Sussex Inlet, a narrow inlet connecting Wreck Bay to the waterbody of St Georges Basin. The east bank of Sussex Inlet is the Booderee National Park. 

Sussex Inlet is located roughly 150km south of Sydney (203km by road). 

References

External links
 SussexInlet.com
 Sussex Inlet website
 Sussex Inlet Info. Website
VISITNSW.com - Sussex-Inlet

City of Shoalhaven
Towns in New South Wales
Towns in the South Coast (New South Wales)
Coastal towns in New South Wales